Ctenophorus femoralis, the long-tailed sand dragon, is a species of agamid lizard occurring on spinifex covered sand-ridges and sand-plains on the arid mid-western coast of Western Australia.

References

Agamid lizards of Australia
femoralis
Endemic fauna of Australia
Reptiles described in 1965
Taxa named by Glen Milton Storr